The Constitution of Uzbekistan of 1978 was adopted on 19 April 1978 at the extraordinary session of the Supreme Soviet of Uzbekistan. The Constitution of Uzbekistan of 1978 contains 11 parts and it is further divided into 21 chapters.

Part I. - Fundamentals of social structure and politics

-Chapter 1 - Political System

- Article 1:
The Republic of Uzbekistan is a socialist state, expressing the will and interests of the workers, farmers and intellectuals, working people of all nations and nationalities of the country.

- Article 2:
 All power belongs to the people of the Republic of Uzbekistan.
 The people exercise state power through Council of People's Deputies, which constitute the political foundation of the Republic of Uzbekistan.
 All other state bodies are controlled by and accountable to the Council of People's Deputies.

- Article 3:
Organization and activities of Soviet state is in accordance with the principle of democratic centralism: election of all public authorities from top to bottom & their accountability to the people and binding of all decisions of higher bodies to lower bodies. Democratic centralism combines central leadership with local initiative and creative activity in the field, with the responsibility of each state body and official for their work.

- Article 4:
 Soviet state and all its agencies operate on the basis of socialist law, ensure the maintenance of law and order and the interests of society and the rights and freedoms of citizens.
 State and public organizations and officials shall observe the Constitution of the USSR, Constitution of the Republic of Uzbekistan, and the Soviet laws.

- Article 5:
The most important matters of state are submitted to public discussion and put to a popular vote (referendum.)

- Article 6:
 Leading and guiding force of Soviet society and the nucleus of its political system, government and public organizations, is the Communist Party of the Soviet Union. CPSU exists for the people and serves the people .
 Armed Marxism–Leninism, the Communist Party determines the general perspectives of the development of society and the course of domestic and foreign policy of the USSR, directs the great constructive work of the Soviet people, and imparts a planned, science-based nature of his struggle for the victory of communism.
 All Party organizations operate within the framework of the Constitution of the USSR.

- Article 7:
Trade unions, the All-Union Leninist Young Communist League, cooperative and other public organizations, in accordance with its statutory objectives in managing state and public affairs, in the political, economic and socio-cultural issues.

- Article 8:
 Work collectives take part in discussing and deciding state and public affairs, in production planning and social development, in the preparation and placement of personnel in the discussion and resolution of issues of management of enterprises and institutions, to improve living and working conditions, use of funds allocated for the development of production and for social and cultural activities and financial incentives.
 Work collectives promote socialist emulation, the spread of best practices, strengthen labor discipline, educate their members in the spirit of communist morality, care about raising their political consciousness, culture and professional qualifications.

- Article 9:
The main direction of development of the political system of Soviet society is the extension of socialist democracy, the increased participation of citizens in the affairs of state and society, improving the state apparatus, increased activity of public organizations, increased control, strengthening the legal framework of public life, greater openness, constant responsiveness to public opinion.

-Chapter 2 - Economic System

- Article 10:
 Basis of the economic system of the Republic of Uzbekistan is socialist ownership of the means of production in the form of government (the people), and co-operative ownership.
 Socialist property is also property of trade unions and other public organizations, they need to carry out statutory tasks.
 The state protects socialist property and provides conditions for its growth.
 Nobody has the right to use socialist property for personal gain or other selfish purposes.

- Article 11:
 State ownership - the common heritage of the entire Soviet people, the basic form of socialist property.
 In the exclusive property of the state land, its minerals, waters and forests. The state owns the major means of production in industry, construction and agriculture, transport and communication, banking, property organized by the state trade, utilities and other enterprises, the main urban housing and other property necessary for the implementation of the tasks of the state.

- Article 12:
 Property of the collective farms and other cooperative organizations and their associations are the means of production and other property necessary for them to carry out statutory tasks.
 The land occupied by collective farms is secured to them in a free and unlimited use.
 The state promotes the development of co-operative property and its approximation to the state.
 Collective farms, like other land users are obliged to use land efficiently, and care for it to increase its fertility.

- Article 13:
 Basis of the personal property of citizens of the Republic of Uzbekistan consists of labor income. In personal property may be household goods, personal consumption, convenience and utility of the household, a house and labor savings. Personal property of citizens and the right to inherit under state protection.
 Citizens may own plots of land, granted in accordance with the law for subsidiary farming (including the keeping of livestock and poultry), gardening, as well as for individual housing construction. Citizens are required to make rational use of land allotted to them. State and collective farms provide assistance to citizens in their small-holdings.
 Property located in the private ownership or use of the citizens, should not serve to derive unearned income used to the detriment of society.

References

Sources
http://zakonuz.uzshar.com/?document=5990 - The Constitution

1978 documents
Uzbekistan
Political history of Uzbekistan
Law of Uzbekistan
Uzbek SSR
1978 in Uzbekistan
Uzbek Soviet Socialist Republic